John Bentley (born 5 September 1966) is an English former dual-code international rugby union and rugby league footballer who played in the 1980s and 1990s. Nicknamed 'Bentos', he played club rugby union as a wing for Otley, Sale, Newcastle and Rotherham. Internationally he won 4 caps for England and toured with the British and Irish Lions in 1997, winning 2 test caps.

He won 5 international caps for England, and 2 for Great Britain.

Background
Bentley was born in Dewsbury, West Riding of Yorkshire, England. He currently lives in nearby Mirfield with his wife Sandy and three children. He is currently involved with Leeds Tykes community rugby programme and matchday entertainment. He is an Honorary President of the Yorkshire region of the rugby charity Wooden Spoon improving the lives of disadvantaged children and young people in Britain and Ireland, and hosts and coaches at rugby union camps across England with Sale Sharks, Newcastle Falcons, and Leeds Carnegie.

Career
Originally a rugby union player, he made his England début against Ireland in 1988 aged 21 and played on the summer tour against Australia.

After training as a policeman he switched codes from rugby union, which was then an amateur game, to rugby league, where he became a professional. He played for Leeds, before moving on to Halifax, as well as enjoying a short spell in Australia with Balmain Tigers. He played for Great Britain, and for England in the 1995 Rugby League World Cup

When rugby union became openly professional in 1995, Bentley returned to the code, signing for Newcastle Falcons in 1996. He made 3 appearances as they won their first and so far only Premiership title in 1998. He was selected for the 1997 British and Irish Lions tour to South Africa, where he played in the second and third Tests. After the tour he played twice more for England at rugby union before switching back to rugby league with Huddersfield Giants.

References

External links 
Sporting Heroes profile
ESPN profile
After Dinner Speaker profile
Soccer Speaker profile
Bentley proves his true worth
Leeds profile
Cleckheaton RUFC

1966 births
Living people
Balmain Tigers players
British & Irish Lions rugby union players from England
Dual-code rugby internationals
England international rugby union players
England national rugby league team players
English rugby league players
English rugby union players
Great Britain national rugby league team players
Halifax R.L.F.C. players
Huddersfield Giants players
Leeds Rhinos players
Newcastle Falcons players
Rotherham Titans players
Rugby league players from Dewsbury
Rugby league wingers
Rugby union players from Dewsbury
Rugby union wings
Sale Sharks players
Yorkshire County RFU players